The Spirits Of Our Ancestors is an album by pianist Randy Weston that was recorded in 1991 and issued on the Verve label. While all of the compositions (with the exception of one traditional Moroccan song) were composed by Weston himself, the music on the album is more specifically a collaborative arranging effort between Weston and arranger Melba Liston. The music on Spirits is played by an all-star cast of musicians, including Dizzy Gillespie, Pharoah Sanders, Dewey Redman, Idris Muhammad, and Idrees Sulieman.

Spirits was originally intended to be a grand culmination of Weston's experience living in and absorbing the music of Morocco. The album was to be recorded with the local musicians he had been exposed to on location in Morocco; however, due to the onset of the Gulf War around the time of recording, they decided to relocate to New York City. This change of plans did not affect the authenticity of the music. The main focus of the album, as stated in the liner notes, is to "pay homage to our musical predecessors" and to "celebrate the universal musical language that transcends race, color, and nationality."

Track listing 

 "African Village Bedford-Stuyvesant" 3:21
 "The Healers" 10:48
 "African Cookbook" 17:16
 "La Elaha-Ella Allah/Morad Allah" (traditional) 6:43
 "The Call" 6:12
 "African Village Bedford-Stuyvesant 2" 8:30
 "The Seventh Queen" 16:28
 "Blue Moses" 12:01
 "African Sunrise" 19:54
 "A Prayer For Us All"

Personnel 
 Randy Weston - piano  (not on 4) 
 Idrees Sulieman - trumpet  (on 2,3,5,6,7,9) 
 Dizzy Gillespie - trumpet  (on 9) 
 Benny Powell - trombone  (on 2,3,5,6,7,9) 
 Talib Kibwe - flute, alt sax  (on 2,5,6,7,9) 
 Billy Harper - tenor sax  (on 2,3,5,6,7,9) 
 Dewey Redman - tenor sax  (on 2,3,5,6,7,9) 
 Pharoah Sanders - tenor sax, gaita  (on 3 >8) 
 Alex Blake - bass  (on 2,3,5,6,7,8,9) 
 Jamil Nasser - bass  (on 2,3,4,5,6,8,9) 
 Idris Muhammad - drums  (on 2,3,5,6,7,8,9) 
 Azzedin Weston - percussion (on 2,3,4,6,9) 
 Big Black - percussion  (on 3,5,6,7,8,9) 
 Yassir Chadly - percussion, karkaba, vocal (on 4 >8)

Production
 Randy Weston – arranger, producer, liner notes  
 Rhashidah E. McNeill – liner notes  
 Yassir Chadly – arranger 
 Melba Liston – arranger  
 Jean-Philippe Allard – producer  
 Brian Bacchus – producer  
 Talib Kibwe – musical director 
 Jay Newland – engineer  
 Joe Lopes – assistant engineer  
 Cheung Ching Ming – photography 
 Daniel Richard – release preparation

References

External links 
 Randy Weston Official Website

1991 albums
Randy Weston albums
Albums arranged by Melba Liston
Verve Records albums
Antilles Records albums